Robert Land Academy (RLA) is Canada's only non-university level private military academy. Located in the township of West Lincoln on the north shores of the Welland River five kilometres west of the hamlet of Wellandport, the Academy began to accept students in 1978.

The Academy is an all-boys institution. On average, a total of 160 students between Grade 5 (last year of elementary school) and Grade 12 (last year of high school) are enrolled at the Academy during any one school year.

All students enrolled at the Academy live in military-style dormitories located on-campus throughout the school year. The barracks are normally named in tribute to famous military figures in pre-Confederation Canadian history, such as Major-General Isaac Brock (leader of British forces at the Battle of Queenston Heights during the War of 1812), Major John Butler (leader of the irregular militia regiment named after him, Butler's Rangers, formed for service in the American Revolutionary War), and Joseph Brant (1743–1807) who was a Mohawk military and political leader who was closely associated with Great Britain during and after the American Revolution.

Heritage
The school itself is named after Robert Land, an adventurous, loyal frontiersman, who served with the 79th Gordon Highlanders of the British Army. He saw action in the Siege of Louisbourg and fought with General Wolfe at the Battle of the Plains of Abraham.

Robert Land remained loyal to the Crown when the American Revolution broke out. After the Rebel Militia razed their home, the Land family fled to New York. Robert Land continued in dangerous missions for the British, leading troops through unmapped, otherwise hostile native Indian Territory to attack rebel strongholds.

At the end of the hostilities, Captain Robert Land crossed the Niagara River. It was here, after so many hardships, that the Land family settled under the British Flag of Upper Canada and were the first settlers of what is now the City of Hamilton. Robert Land died in 1818 at the age of 82 years.

G. Scott Bowman, the Academy's Founder, is a direct descendant of Robert Land and his wife Phoebe Land.

Robert Land's life as a frontiersman, soldier, father and magistrate personified the values of labour, loyalty, courage, commitment and honour. These values are the central pillars upon which the Academy exists. They have and will continue to be a part of our heritage. The Academy's goal is to instil these values while demonstrating them concretely through example and programming.

Purpose
According to the Academy's website, the military theme allows for the reinforcement of the importance of organization, teamwork, discipline and personal responsibility. Students admitted to the Academy are chosen for their potential for success. Students admitted to the Academy mostly do not fit in the public school system because of academics, behaviour, attitude and other problems. Other students have been diagnosed with various learning disorders, including Autism, Attention-Deficit Hyperactivity Disorder (ADHD), Oppositional Defiant Disorder (ODD) and various forms of learning disability. The Academy asserts that 100% of its graduating class who apply to university or college are accepted each year. It also states that 95% of all students experience a dramatic improvement in their academic performance and success within their first semester of enrollment.

Affiliations with the Canadian Armed Forces
The Academy sponsors a closed cadet corps of the Royal Canadian Army Cadets, #2968 Robert Land Academy Royal Canadian Army Cadet Corps, which is also affiliated with The Lincoln and Welland Regiment (the Niagara Region's local Canadian Forces army reserve infantry unit) and The Royal Canadian Regiment (one of the Canadian Forces' three Regular Force infantry regiments). Membership in #2968 RCACC was mandatory for grade 9 students of the 08/09 year.

Activities

Fall Ex
The Fall Ex or Fall exercise is an approximately 90 km hike through the Bruce Trail. The Fall exercise occurs annually every Tuesday before Canadian Thanksgiving and ends on Thursday. During the excursion, students pass through areas such as Ball's Falls, Short Hills and the Screaming Tunnel. On the second day of the Fall Ex students sleep at Fort George. On the third and final day, students take turns carrying a cannon to Queenston heights in which a parade is conducted. Students who have completed the Fall Ex are awarded the Bakers Badge.

Rank structure within the academy

Student ranks

On first being accepted at the Academy, all students hold the rank of Recruit. The first phase of non-academic training at the Academy for new students, normally lasting a month's period, is always referred to as the "Recruit Period" and they will dress in a tan beret to signify their recruit status, Upon passing Recruit Period, by showing a standard of organizational skills with good behaviour, the student is promoted to Cadet and given the right to wear the blue beret with the academy's cap badge. A student who makes serious mistakes may be placed on charge, meaning he stays the rank of recruit for a period of time and whatever rank this student was is suspended. The student has to wear an orange beret or tan beret until being reinstated back to the rank cadet or higher.

After being promoted to the rank of Cadet, students at the Academy, on proving their ability to demonstrate rudimentary leadership and organizational skills, may be promoted to the rank of Barman, which is normally marked by a silver bar similar to the insignia of a United States Army lieutenant.

On reaching Barman rank and getting a position within the academy, the student may then advance in either one of two ways:

 If the student demonstrates equivalent leadership skills, he can then be promoted to the rank of Double Barman (marked with two silver bars similar to the insignia of a U.S. Army captain). Students in grades 5 to 10 must obtain the rank of Leading barman followed by Master Barman before they may be promoted higher.
 If the student shows exceptional leadership skills, he can then be promoted to the rank of Lance Corporal (the equivalent of the same rank in the British Army). From there, promotions can proceed through the ranks of Corporal, Master Corporal, Sergeant and finally Warrant Officer (paralleling the rank structure of the modern Canadian Forces).

During a school year, the senior ranking student on campus is acknowledged as '"Head Boy"', and normally wears the rank of Sergeant or Warrant Officer. The other two senior student positions are '"Parade Sergeant Major"' and '"Aide-de-Camp"', both of which may wear either the rank of Sergeant or Warrant Officer, together they are referred to as "Top 3" at the academy.

Staff ranks
Staff members at the Academy are organized into three general categories:

 Academy officers
 Academy staff non-commissioned officers (NCOs)
 Academy civilian staff

Academy officers normally wear the officer rank insignia which existed in the Canadian Army before 1968 ("pips" and crowns). Teachers wear either a second lieutenant's one "pip" or a lieutenant's two "pip" stars, company commanders wear a captain's three "pip" stars and the Headmaster wears a lieutenant colonel's crown and one "pip".

Academy staff non-commissioned officers are normally composed of the Academy Sergeant-Major (ASM) and his immediate subordinates, the Company Sergeants-Major (CSM). The ASM and the CSMs handle all daily drill and other military-themed classes at the Academy.

Academy civilian staff (including the staff running the Academy kitchen, the groundskeepers and the administrative staff) do not wear military-style uniforms and do not hold an Academy rank.

Discipline
Robert Land Academy is a highly structured living and learning environment. Within this context, the purpose of discipline is to change behaviour and to learn self-regulation.

The Academy strives for students to learn to consider incentives and disincentives before taking action. Right choices reap rewards while poor choices reap consequences. Rewards come in the form of extra privileges, leaves, promotions, special assignments, etc. While consequences are in form of laps, physical exercise, loss of privileges, extra chores, suspension from regular duties, loss of leaves and stand-downs, or dismissal from the Academy.

Consequences are given subject to the severity of the behaviour and whether it is repeat behaviour. Severe behaviours may result in suspension, which may include (but are not limited to) assault, cheating or academic misconduct, AWOL, theft, racial slurs or discrimination, possession of contraband, bullying, or repeated offence. Severe Behaviour can also result in a student being seen on charge by a company commander. Being Seen on charge result in extra chores, physical training, loss of privileges and demotion. In past years, students on charge were given orange berets to signify that they were on charge. This has been changed however due to its humiliating effects. Charges by the company commander generally last a month, this is subject to change based on student conduct and the severity of the case. For the most severe behaviours, students may be seen on charge by the headmaster which usually results in a suspension or dismissal from the academy. Students who are not suspended or dismissed from the academy have all the consequences of a regular charge which usually lasts many months (Subject to change based on the student's conduct and severity). Charges are done formally. Students are marched towards a company commander or headmaster by an NCO member of staff. The proceedings continue and the appropriate actions are taken.

On occasion, a section, class or company receives discipline as a group for collective behaviour contrary to the expectations of the Academy.

Controversy

Robert Land Academy entered some controversy on November 13, 1998, after two boys, Matt Toppi, 17 years of age, and Christopher Brown, 16 years of age, were both killed after running away from Robert Land Academy and had been struck by a freight train. The Prince George Citizen reported that "original reports from police indicated that the deaths were part of a suicide pact. But one of the victims' family said his family was told Monday by police that Toppi was trying to save the second boy when the pair were hit by the train." Robert Land Academy had come under fire due to some of its students saying that it had partly been the stressful and intense, military-like environment that Robert Land Academy had. Robert Land Academy has also been through some controversy after ex-cadets at the school had come out to abuse and bullying that happened at Robert Land Academy.

Deaths

 Matt Toppi (1981 -1998) was hit by a freight train after laying on train tracks.
 Christoper Brown (1982-1998) was hit by a freight train after laying on train tracks.
Donald James (1993-2010) jumped out of his mother's car in traffic while being transported to Robert Land Academy

Centauri Summer Arts Camp 
For 25 seasons (1995 to 2019) the property was used by the Centauri Summer Arts Camp during the summer. This overnight arts camp closed its doors after 2019, in part due to the COVID-19 pandemic preventing operations the following year.

External links
 Robert Land Academy

References

Military education and training in Canada
Educational institutions established in 1978
Military academies of Canada
Military high schools
Private schools in Ontario
Boys' schools in Canada
1978 establishments in Ontario
Controversies in Canada